The 2012–13 season is Fenerbahçe's 55th consecutive season in the Süper Lig and their 105th year in existence. They also competed in the UEFA Champions League starting in the third qualifying round after being second in the 2011–12 domestic season.

Season overview
 3 June 2012, Kuyt joined the team 3 years from Liverpool.
 6 June 2012, Salih joined to team.
 22 June 2012, UEFA sent a letter to the TFF approving Fenerbahçe's participation in the UEFA Champions League, the European football body's topflight club competition. On the same day Hasan Ali joined the team.
 1 July 2012, Mehmet Topal joined the team with a contract of 4 years from Valencia
 2 July 2012, Fenerbahçe's chairman Aziz Yıldırım and three other jailed suspects were released after the chief judge of the specially authorized 16th İstanbul High Criminal Court, Mehmet Ekinci, delivered the verdict in a year-long match-fixing case on Monday, but the court stated that Aziz Yıldırım has been sentenced to six years, three months for creating and managing a criminal organization and for rigging several football matches. The decision has been forwarded to the Supreme Court of Appeals for review.
 3 July 2012, Fenerbahçe football players all sported T-shirts with Fenerbahçe Chairman Aziz Yıldırım pictured on the front, along with a message he sent them from within prison, at their first pre-season training session on Tuesday. The players unfurled a banner that read “Fenerbahçe forever” and posed for members of the press while holding it.
 4 July 2012, Egemen joined the team, and on 9 July 2012 Issiar Dia transferred to the Qatars team Lekhwiya with the transfer fee €4 Million.
 16 July 2012, for the pre-season camp Fenerbahçe team was going to Austria, here they will play four Friendly games.
 20 July 2012, Fenerbahçe get Vaslui from Romania in the draw for the Third qualifying round of the Champions League.
 1 August 2012, in the season's first match the club salvage late draw against Vaslui in the Third qualifying round of the Champions League, with the score being 1-1.
 3 August 2012, Krasić transferred for 7M € on a four-year contract.
 4 August 2012, Joseph Yobo signs three-year contract with the club.
 8 August 2012, the club celebrate its first win of the season in the second leg against Vaslui in the Third Qualifying round of the Champions League, winning 4-1 on the night and 5-2 on aggregate to advance to the play-off round.
 10 August 2012, the club are drawn against Russian side Spartak Moscow in the Play-off roundof the Champions League.
 12 August 2012 Fenerbahçe lose the Süper Kupa against local rivals Galatasaray 3–2.
 18 August 2012, in 2012–13 season's Süper Lig first match Fenerbahçe late a draw against Elazığspor with score 1–1. On 21 August 2012,  Fenerbahçe lose the play-off round's first match against Spartak Moscow with score 2–1 in UEFA Champions League.
 27 August 2012, defeated southeastern side Gaziantepspor 3–0 in week two of the Süper Lig on Saturday night for its first domestic league of the season and also for its first win in four official matches. But Saturday's victory was eclipsed by the crisis between Brazilian captain and playmaker Alex and young coach Aykut Kocaman, which saw the Brazilian excluded completely from the Saturday roster. For the record: A fit Alex has always been included in the starting XI since he joined the Istanbul club in 2004. Therefore, without the slightest doubt there is something wrong somewhere. The match was played “behind closed doors,” meaning adult men were banned, while women and children were allowed in for free. And even the female spectators took sides, asking, “Say Aykut Kocaman, where is Alex?” And this prompted Fenerbahçe Chairman Aziz Yıldırım to grab the stadium microphone during the match maybe something unprecedented in football history and say the following: “You are mistaken,” he said to the chanting fans. “Respect and support the players on the pitch. No one is greater than Fenerbahçe,” he asserted. Yıldırım further said after the match: “I can give my life for Fenerbahçe. No one is above Fenerbahçe, not even Aziz Yıldırım. Players go, Aziz Yıldırım will, everyone will go, but Fenerbahçe will remain,” he noted. He later said he has invited Alex for talks on Monday.
 29 August 2012, Fenerbahçe was eliminated by Spartak Moscow with aggregate score 3–2 and will enter the group stage of the 2012–13 UEFA Europa League.
 1 October 2012, Alex's contract was terminated.
 29 October 2012, Antalyaspor ends Fenerbahçe's 47-match unbeaten run in the Süper Lig at Şükrü Saracoğlu Stadium in Kadıköy had to come to an end some day with score 1–3. Fenerbahçe had not lost a single match at home in Kadıköy ever since they were beaten 2–3 by eventual champion Bursaspor in week 22, on 22 February 2010. Fenerbahçe won 38 and drew nine in the 47 matches they played within 980 days since 22 February 2010. On 3 November 2012, Fenerbahçe peck Akhisar Belediyespor to break 181-day away jinx.
 2 May 2013, Fenerbahçe was eliminated by Benfica with aggregate score 3–2 in 2012–13 Europa League in semi-final, and this is the biggest success in Fenerbahçe's history to arrive into the Semi-final in European competitions.

Kits
Fenerbahçe's 2012–13 kits introduced on 27 July 2012 in Şükrü Saracoğlu Stadium and produced by Adidas. Home kit's name is "2013 Efsane Çubuklu Forma" that means 2013 Legendary Barred Kit, away kit's name is "2013 Arma Forma" that means 2013 Emblem Kit and third kit's name is "2013 Gölge Kanarya Forma" that means 2013 Shadow Canary Kit.

Supplier: Adidas
Main sponsor: Türk Telekom

Back sponsor: Ülker
Sleeve sponsor: Avea

Short sponsor: –
Socks sponsor: –

Transfers

In

Total spending:  €33.9 million

Out

Total spending:  €4 million

Line-up

First team squad

Squad statistics

1Includes 2012 Turkish Super Cup

Statistics

Top scorers

1Includes 2012 Turkish Super Cup

2Players who no longer play for Fenerbahçe's current season

Cards

1Players who no longer play for Fenerbahçe's current season

Club hierarchy

Board of directors

Management

Pre-season friendlies

Competitions

Overall

Süper Kupa

Süper Lig

League table

Results summary

Results by round

Matches

Türkiye Kupası

Group stage
8 winners from the fifth and the last qualifying round will be split into two groups of 4 teams. This stage will be a round-robin tournament with home and away matches, in the vein of UEFA European competitions' group stages. The winners and runners-up of the two groups will advance to the semi-finals.

Group A

Matches

Semi-finals

Final

UEFA Champions League

Third qualifying round

Play-off round

UEFA Europa League

Group stage

Group C

Matches

Knockout phase

Round of 32

Round of 16

Quarter-finals

Semi-finals

See also
 2012 Süper Kupa
 2012–13 Süper Lig
 2012–13 Türkiye Kupası
 2012–13 UEFA Champions League
 2012–13 UEFA Europa League

Footnotes

References

Fenerbahçe S.K. (football) seasons
Fenerbahce